The genus Enchytraeus includes about 40 species of annelid worms. The term white worm is often used for all of the species in general, but specifically it is E. albidus which is named the white worm. This species is used as fish food by aquarium enthusiasts. E. buchholzi is known as the Grindal worm. It was named for the Swedish fish breeder that first raised the worm to feed her fish.

Some species are terrestrial, some semi-aquatic, and others marine. Some can be found in brackish water or on beaches. Several of these species lack sex organs and reproduce by fragmenting, notably E. fragmentosus, which gets its name from this characteristic.

Species include:
Enchytraeus albidus ("White worms")
Enchytraeus buchholzi ("Grindal worms")
Enchytraeus capitatus 
Enchytraeus citrinus
Enchytraeus fragmentosus
Enchytraeus japonensis
Enchytraeus kincaidi
Enchytraeus lacteus
Enchytraeus liefdeensis
Enchytraeus minutus
Enchytraeus multiannulatoides
Enchytraeus multiannulatus
Enchytraeus rupus
Enchytraeus saxicola
Enchytraeus variatus

External links
 White Worm Devrim Memi et al. The Effect of Different Diets on the White Worm (Enchytraeus albidus Henle, 1837)Reproduction, Turkish Journal of Fisheries and Aquatic Sciences 4: 05-07 (2004)

Enchytraeidae